Honeyhoney (stylized as honeyhoney) is an Americana group based in Los Angeles, California, United States.

History
The band was formed in 2006 by musician Benjamin Jaffe and musician/model/actress Suzanne Santo.  The two met at a costume party and signed a record deal a year later.  They originally performed under the name Zanzibar Lewis and were under that name when they signed with the now-defunct Ironworks record label.

Their debut album, First Rodeo, was released by Ironworks on November 4.  Ironworks co-owner Kiefer Sutherland directed and starred in the group's music video for their song "Little Toy Gun".  Honeyhoney toured with Lifehouse, another Ironworks band, at the start of their career.  The band released their second studio album, Billy Jack, on Oct 24, 2011 under their own honeyhoney Records/Lost Highway label.

Their third album, 3, was produced by Dave Cobb and released June 9, 2015.  The website American Songwriter reviewed it writing, "with a singer-songwriter that exudes the magnetic passion and swaggering star power of Santo, this is a group whose time has come."

Style
Paste Magazine describes honeyhoney's style as "display[ing] the common pop thread between alt.country, spaghetti western soundtracks and swampy blues."

Glide Magazine stated that "honeyhoney deftly mixes elements of folk, soul, country, pop, and rock."

Outreach
In April 2014, the band traveled to Williamstown, Massachusetts, where Jaffe was raised, to perform a concert on behalf of local music programs.  The band is planning a similar concert for schools in Santo's hometown of Cleveland, Ohio.

Discography

Albums

Extended plays

Suzanne Santo collaborations
"On the Shelf" from the album Fool's Gold by Big B
"The Game" by Oleg Tumanov
"Take Me Away" from the album Starting Ground by Josh Blackburn

In the media
Their song "Lullaby" was featured in an anti-smoking ad that featured the grim reaper disguised as an attractive woman who gave out free cigarettes
Their song "Little Toy Gun" was featured in a promo for the Showtime network
Their song "LA River" was used in the series finale of the series Brothers & Sisters
The band performed the opening theme for the first season of the television series The Guest Book, appear at the end of every episode to perform a song live at a "venue" in the series, and make a few brief appearances in other scenes.

References

External links
 
 
 honeyhoney  on KCRW's Morning Becomes Eclectic

Musical groups established in 2006
Musical groups from Los Angeles
American musical duos
Folk rock groups from California
Ironworks (record label) artists